Snowyside Peak, at  above sea level, is the fifth-highest peak in the Sawtooth Range of the U.S. state of Idaho. The peak is located in the Sawtooth Wilderness of Sawtooth National Recreation Area at the intersection of Blaine, Custer County, and Elmore counties. It is the highest point in Elmore County. It is the 217th-highest peak in Idaho.

See also

 List of peaks of the Sawtooth Range (Idaho)
 List of mountains of Idaho
 List of mountain peaks of Idaho
 List of mountain ranges in Idaho

References 

Mountains of Blaine County, Idaho
Mountains of Custer County, Idaho
Mountains of Elmore County, Idaho
Mountains of Idaho
Sawtooth Wilderness